Civil Force is a district-based pro-Beijing political party in Hong Kong. Since 2014, the Civil Force has entered an alliance with the New People's Party of Regina Ip. Headed by chairman Pun Kwok-shan, it had its stronghold in the Sha Tin and Sai Kung Districts and had once the majority of seats in the Sha Tin District Council until its total defeat in 2019.

History
It was established in 1993 by a former member of United Democrats of Hong Kong, Lau Kong-wah and 8 other Sha Tin District Board members.

Lau was defeated by Emily Lau in both the 1991 LegCo elections and the 1995 LegCo elections. In 1996, Lau secured a seat in the Provisional Legislative Council. He was elected into LegCo in since 1998 LegCo elections in the New Territories East geographical constituency, after he joined the pro-Beijing Democratic Alliance for Betterment of Hong Kong (DAB).

In 2003, due to the pro-government stance of DAB especially on the issue of implementing Article 23 of the Basic Law, the popularity of Lau, being a member of the DAB, was affected, and the Civil Force performed not as well in the 2003 District Council elections. Campaigns of some of the members emphasise more on the banner of Civil Force and their local contributions, and did not mention the convenor's connection with the DAB. Lau himself lost the seat in the Kam To constituency for the Sha Tin District Council despite his long service in the district. The Civil Force retained 14 seats in the Sha Tin District Council, and 3 seats in the Sai Kung District Council.

In the 2012 Legislative Council election, Lau Kong-wah lost in the District Council (Second) functional constituency election while the newly joined member Scarlett Pong failed to win a seat in the New Territories East constituency. Civil Force had not been represented in the Legislative Council for the first time. It returned to the legislature with one seat when LegCo member Lam Tai-fai joined the Civil Force on 1 January 2013.

The Civil Force formed a political alliance with the New People's Party (NPP), headed by Regina Ip, in February 2014. Civil Force leader Pun Kwok-shan was appointed Vice-Chairman of the New People's Party, while members of either parties can acquire membership of the other party. The alliance fielded 23 candidates to contest the 2015 District Council elections and won 11 seats. Some Civil Force district councilors withdrew from NPP to avoid the political impact.

Eunice Yung won a seat for Civil Force and NPP in the 2016 Legislative Council election in New Territories East.

In 2019, amidst the ongoing social movement against the extradition bill, the pro-Beijing camp suffered unprecedented defeat in the District Council elections. The NPP-Civil Force alliance fielded 28 candidates but did not win any seats. As a result, Civil Force was eliminated from all the district councils for the first time since its establishment.

Election performances

Legislative Council elections

Municipal elections

District Councils elections

Representatives

Legislative Council

District Councils

References

External links
Web site of Civil Force
Lau Kwong Wah, Hong Kong Legislative Council

1993 establishments in Hong Kong
Political parties in Hong Kong
Political parties established in 1993
Sai Kung District
Sha Tin District